The George Vari Engineering and Computing Centre is a 4-story building that is part of Toronto Metropolitan University in Toronto, Ontario, Canada.

Initially, in 2000, Santiago Calatrava proposed that the engineering building be 33 floors. The cost was $90 million and $25 million over the university's budget.

Completed in 2004 by Moriyama & Teshima Architects, the state-of-the-art building cost $45 million to complete.

The building houses the Faculty of Engineering and Architectural Science Dean's Office, the First Year Engineering Office and the offices for the Departments of Aerospace Engineering; Electrical, Computer, and Biomedical Engineering; Computer Science; and Mathematics.

The building was officially renamed in 2005 as the George Vari Centre for Computing and Engineering after a gift from George and Helen Vari.

References

External links
 Ryerson Centre for Computing and Engineering
 Timelapse movie of the construction
 Photographs of the construction

Toronto Metropolitan University buildings